Pornpetch Wichitcholchai (born 1 August 1948) is a Thai lawyer who has served as the President of the Senate of Thailand since 24 May 2019. He was previously President of the National Legislative Assembly from August 2014 to May 2019.

Education
Pornpetch attended high school at Vajiravudh College. He studied law at Chulalongkorn University, obtaining a bachelor's degree, and undertook postgraduate studies at the Harvard Law School, obtaining a master's degree.

Career
He began work in government service for the first time in the legal position for Council of State. He previously served as a Supreme Court judge, chairman of the Court of Appeal Region 4, and Chief Justice of the Supreme Court. He was formerly a professor in the legal faculties of many universities. He also plays an important role in foreign countries as the Executive Director of the ASEAN Law Association since 1987, having been the Chairman of the National Law Committee of the ASEAN Law Association. While serving as President of the National Legislative Assembly, he was invited by the Inter-Parliamentary Union (IPU) to attend the World Conference of Speakers of Parliaments and gave a speech at the United Nations.

On 1 December 2016, Pornpetch, as the President of the National Legislative Assembly invited Crown Prince Vajiralongkorn to ascend to the throne as King after the death of Bhumibol Adulyadej.

On 24 May 2019, the military-appointed Senate convened for its first session, in which Pornpetch was elected Senate president unopposed.

Honours
:
 Knight Grand Cordon (Special Class) of the Most Exalted Order of the White Elephant

References

Pornpetch Wichitcholchai
Pornpetch Wichitcholchai
Pornpetch Wichitcholchai
Pornpetch Wichitcholchai
1948 births
Living people
Pornpetch Wichitcholchai
Harvard Law School alumni
Pornpetch Wichitcholchai